The following is a list of Registered Historic Places in Grand Traverse County, Michigan.



|}

See also

List of Michigan State Historic Sites in Grand Traverse County, Michigan
National Register of Historic Places listings in Michigan
 Listings in neighboring counties: Antrim, Benzie, Leelanau, Manistee, Missaukee, Wexford

References

Grand Traverse County
Grand Traverse County, Michigan
Buildings and structures in Grand Traverse County, Michigan